The Melibokus (also Melibocus, Malchen or Malschen) is at 517 metres (1696 feet), the highest hill in the Bergstraße region of southern Hesse, central Germany. It was also the name of a hill in Germania described by classical sources. But the two are probably not the same.

Melibokus overlooks the Rhine valley on the western fringe of the Odenwald region and is a local landmark, clearly visible for many miles. On the summit there is a small cafe, a public lookout tower and a US Army radio mast erected on the site of a previous stone tower, destroyed during World War II. The hill is accessible from Zwingenberg/Bergstrasse by foot. The "Nibelungensteig" hill trail leads you from the railway station in Zwingenberg towards the east.

Despite the modern use of the classical name, the mountain mentioned in classical sources was probably either the Harz mountains, or Thuringian Forest or both. Ptolemy's Geography (Book 2, Chapter 10) mentions the Melobokon oros, as being just to the south of the Cherusci, corresponding to the mountainous "Silva Bacenis" which Julius Caesar mentioned as separating the Cherusci and the Chatti in Hesse.

The medieval place name of the modern Melibokus was Mons Malscus, and there is a settlement in the region, Malchen. One possible etymology derives the name from Old High German , "conceited", which Julius Pokorny reports is from Indo-European mel- "grind" in the sense of "ground down" or "weak".

References

External links
 Melibokus web site (with live webcam)

Hills of Hesse
Bergstraße (district)